Juan David Macías Alcívar (born 15 January 2005) is an Ecuadorian footballer currently playing as a midfielder for Quito.

Club career
Macías started his career at the Soccer School founded by former Ecuadorian international footballer, and Macías' uncle, Claudio Alcívar. In 2016, at the age of eleven, he joined the academy of L.D.U. Quito.

In September 2022, he was named by English newspaper The Guardian as one of the best players born in 2005 worldwide.

Career statistics

Club

References

2005 births
Living people
People from Manabí Province
Ecuadorian footballers
Association football midfielders
Ecuadorian Serie A players
L.D.U. Quito footballers